The Pahranagat National Wildlife Refuge is a protected wildlife refuge, at the southern end of the Pahranagat Valley and administered by the U.S. Fish and Wildlife Service. The  refuge was created on August 16, 1963, and is part of the larger Desert National Wildlife Refuge Complex, which also includes the Ash Meadows National Wildlife Refuge, the Desert National Wildlife Refuge, and the Moapa Valley National Wildlife Refuge.

The refuge provides high-quality migration and wintering habitat for migrating birds, especially waterfowl, within the Pacific Flyway.

History
Work is underway to restore wetland and desert upland habitats to what was found on the refuge over 100 years ago.

Species of concern that spend part of the year at Pahranagat

Endangered
Endangered species include:
 Southwestern willow flycatcher

Threatened
Threatened species include:
 Desert tortoise

References

External links 

 Pahranagat National Wildlife Refuge
 U.S. Fish and Wildlife Service, Desert National Wildlife Refuge Complex

Desert National Wildlife Refuge Complex
National Wildlife Refuges in Nevada
Protected areas of Lincoln County, Nevada
Wetlands of Nevada
Landforms of Lincoln County, Nevada